Collateral Beauty is a 2016 American fantasy drama film directed by David Frankel and written by Allan Loeb. The film stars an ensemble cast of Will Smith, Edward Norton, Keira Knightley, Michael Peña, Naomie Harris, Jacob Latimore, Kate Winslet and Helen Mirren. It follows Howard Inlet, a successful New York advertising executive who suffers a great tragedy, retreats from life where he seeks answers from the universe by writing letters to Love, Time, and Death. Receiving unexpected personal responses, he begins to see how these things interlock and how even loss can reveal moments of meaning and beauty.

Collateral Beauty premiered at the Dubai International Film Festival on December 13, 2016, and was released in the United States on December 16, 2016. It was panned by critics, but grossed $88 million worldwide against its net $36 million budget.

Plot 
Successful advertising executive Howard Inlet becomes clinically depressed after his young daughter's tragic death. Howard spends his time alone, rarely sleeping or eating, and at the office, building domino chains and structures.

Howard's estranged friends and business partners, Whit Yardsham, Claire Wilson, and Simon Scott fear for Howard's health as well as their company's future, as his behavior has cost them numerous high-profile clients and left them on the verge of bankruptcy. As the majority shareholder, Howard has also undermined their efforts to sell the company.

The trio hire a private investigator, Sally Price, to acquire evidence that Howard is unfit to run the company, allowing them to take control. Sally intercepts three letters written by Howard which he posted to the abstract concepts of Love, Time, and Death, and presents them to the group.

Whit, Claire and Simon hire a trio of struggling actors – Amy, Raffi and Brigitte – to masquerade as the abstracts respectively in order to confront Howard about his letters. Their plan is for Sally to record these encounters and then digitally erase the actors to make Howard appear mentally unbalanced, enabling them to sell the company.

In preparation for their roles, Brigitte, Raffi, and Amy spend time with Simon, Claire, and Whit, who are going through personal problems of their own: Simon is secretly battling cancer; Whit is struggling to connect with his pre-teen daughter Allison after cheating on her mother; and Claire is looking for sperm donors to conceive a child after neglecting her private life for years.

After his encounters with "Love", "Time" and "Death", Howard attends a grief support group where he befriends a woman named Madeleine who has lost her own daughter, Olivia, to cancer; which led to the end of her marriage. As Howard meets with Madeleine, she shows him a note from her husband, "If only we could be strangers again..." and continues enigmatically "And now we are." Howard also tells her about his recent "conversations" with Death, Time, and Love. Madeleine tells him that on the day Olivia died, an old woman at the hospital had told her to notice the "Collateral Beauty", which she has learned to recognize as acts of selfless kindness that follow tragedies.

As the group is discussing the actors' performances, Amy storms out of the room because she feels guilty about manipulating Howard. Whit goes to convince her to return and declares romantic interest in her. Amy rejects him, but agrees to commit to their plan if he will make amends with his daughter. Simon similarly confides with Brigitte about his condition and his fear of death. Brigitte encourages him to share the burden with his family.

"Love", "Time", and "Death" confront Howard again but he lashes out at them, particularly Love, externalizing the pain he held inside since his daughter's death. Love tells Howard he owes it to his daughter's existence to love and that he can't live without it. The next day, Howard attends a meeting with his company's board of directors in which footage of the incidents, with the actors digitally removed, is shown. Howard realizes his mental state and behavior are ruining the company and soon voices his gratitude for all that his friends have done for him, promising to be there in their times of need. He then signs the documents placed before him to enable the sale of the agency.

Simon tells his wife about his health condition; she comforts him. Claire meets with Raffi, and he states she will make a good mother someday. Claire says time has caught up to her, to which he replies that her battle with time isn't over yet, and mentions people who had had a positive effect on his young life. Whit visits Allison at school. Although she expresses anger and initially refuses to speak to him, he expresses his love for her and vows to return every day until she talks to him. Allison reconsiders, and in parting, mentions that "tomorrow is a half day of school".

Howard visits Madeleine on Christmas Eve, and she persuades him to watch a video of her husband playing with their daughter. Her husband turns out to be Howard playing dominoes with their daughter Olivia. Howard breaks down and is finally able to acknowledge his daughter's name and cause of death, and hugs Madeleine while crying. Brigitte is revealed to be the woman who had told Madeleine about the concept of collateral beauty.

Howard and Madeleine walk hand-in-hand through Central Park. Howard turns and sees Amy, Raffi and Brigitte watching from a footbridge, but they vanish as Madeleine turns toward them.

Cast

Production

Development and casting
On May 13, 2015, it was announced that Hugh Jackman and Rooney Mara would star in the New York-set drama Collateral Beauty, to be directed by Alfonso Gomez-Rejon and written by Allan Loeb. Loeb wrote the script on spec, saying, "It's something that I've meditated on for a couple of years, the idea of someone who's been through a terrible loss, and was angry and twice destroyed and wrote letters to the Universe. I didn't know why or how or what that meant for years, but it wouldn't leave me alone." Michael Sugar and Bard Dorros were set to produce through their Anonymous Content banner. On June 9, 2015, PalmStar Media's Kevin Frakes came on board to produce and fully finance the film, and Likely Story was also on board to co-produce the film, with Loeb also producing. On June 15, 2015, Variety reported that Jason Segel was in talks to join the cast. On July 15, 2015, it was announced that Jackman had exited the project due to his commitment with 20th Century Fox's Logan, and producers were eyeing Johnny Depp to star instead.

On August 4, 2015, Will Smith was cast to play the lead, replacing Jackman, while Smith's Overbrook Entertainment was set to also produce the film. On September 8, 2015, it was announced that New Line Cinema had come on board to handle worldwide distribution for the film, while Mara had left the project. On October 5, 2015, Gomez-Rejon exited the film due to creative differences with the studio. On November 10, 2015, it was announced that David Frankel was nearing a deal to direct the film. On December 1, 2015, Variety reported that Helen Mirren was in early talks to join the cast, with filming expected to begin early 2016 in New York City. On January 14, 2016, The Wrap reported that Edward Norton, Michael Peña, and Naomie Harris were cast in the film, while Rachel McAdams was in negotiations to join as well. Village Roadshow Pictures was set to co-finance the film. On February 9, 2016, Keira Knightley joined the film, and Kate Winslet was also cast the next day. Enrique Murciano was spotted filming along with Winslet, while Jacob Latimore also joined the film. On March 10, 2016, Ann Dowd signed on to co-star.

Filming 
Principal photography on the film began on February 22, 2016, in Queens in New York City and Manhattan. On March 10, 2016, filming took place at the Whitney Museum of American Art.

Music 

The soundtrack includes of five songs in addition to the original score by Theodore Shapiro. They are:
 "Way Down We Go" Written by Jakull Juliusson, Performed by Kaleo
 "Looking to Closely" written by Finian Greenall, Timothy Thornton and Guy Whitaker, performed by Fink
 "World of Love" Written by Franklin Stribling, performed by Sharon Jones & The Dap Kings
 "Oh What a Beautiful City" Arranged by Dave Van Ronk, performed by Bryan Terrell Clark and Mykal Kilgore
 "Let's Hurt Tonight" Written and produced by Ryan Tedder and Noel Zancanella, performed by OneRepublic

In November 2016, it was confirmed that OneRepublic's song "Let's Hurt Tonight" was part of the soundtrack album. A music video for the song was released on December 6, 2016.

Release 
Collateral Beauty was released by Warner Bros. on December 16, 2016.

Box office
Collateral Beauty grossed $31 million in the United States and Canada and $57.2 million in other territories for a worldwide total of $88.2 million, against a production budget of $36 million.

The film was released alongside Rogue One and the wide expansion of Manchester by the Sea, and was initially expected to gross $11–13 million from 3,028 theaters in its opening weekend, on par with Smith's 2015 drama Concussion. It made $2.4 million on its first day, lowering weekend projections to $7.5 million. It ended up grossing $7.1 million, finishing 4th at the box office and marking the lowest opening of Will Smith's career.

Critical response
On Rotten Tomatoes, the film has an approval rating of 13% based on 188 reviews, and an average rating of 3.70/10. The website's critical consensus reads, "Well-meaning but fundamentally flawed, Collateral Beauty aims for uplift but collapses in unintentional hilarity." On Metacritic, the film has a weighted average score of 23 out of 100 based on 40 critics, indicating "generally unfavorable reviews". Audiences polled by CinemaScore gave the film an average grade of "A−" on an A+ to F scale, while PostTrak reported filmgoers gave it a 76% overall positive score and a 55% "definite recommend".

Vince Mancini of Uproxx criticized the film for its misleading trailers and dialogue, writing, "Edward Norton's character tells Keira Knightley's about holding his now-estranged daughter (he's a workaholic!) in his arms for the first time. 'It wasn't that I felt love, it was that I felt like I had become love'." Richard Roeper gave the film one out of four stars, saying, "Collateral Beauty is a fraud. It is built on a foundation so contrived, so off-putting, so treacly, the most miraculous thing about this movie is this movie was actually made."

Accolades

References

External links
 
 

2016 films
2010s business films
2010s fantasy drama films
2010s romantic fantasy films
American business films
American fantasy drama films
American romantic fantasy films
Dune Entertainment films
2010s English-language films
Films about time
Films about death
Films about depression
Films directed by David Frankel
Films shot in New York City
New Line Cinema films
Overbrook Entertainment films
Films about personifications of death
Village Roadshow Pictures films
Warner Bros. films
Films scored by Theodore Shapiro
2016 drama films
Films with screenplays by Allan Loeb
2010s American films